Paul Kay Sybrowsky (August 22, 1944 – September 10, 2014) was the president of Southern Virginia University (SVU) from June 1, 2012 until August 31, 2014. He was a general authority of the Church of Jesus Christ of Latter-day Saints (LDS Church) from 2005 until 2011. He also served as a commissioner of the Northwest Commission on Colleges and Universities and chairman of the board of trustees of Utah Valley University.

Early life and education
Sybrowsky was born in Salt Lake City, Utah to Paul H. Sybrowsky and his wife, Elizabeth "Betty" Ann Fowler Sybrowsky.

Sybrowsky received a bachelor's degree from Brigham Young University (BYU).  He had started his education at what was then called the Church College of Hawaii, now known as Brigham Young University–Hawaii.  He has served as a member of the President's Leadership Council at both BYU and BYU–Hawaii.  He has also served as chair of the Provo Public Library board.

Business experience
During his professional career, Sybrowsky worked as an executive for several corporations. He worked for a time as the general manager of the American Library Services division of Ameritech. He later worked at library automation giant Dynix, Inc.  Sybrowsky was one of the co-founders of the company.  During his career he worked for several years in Canada and in England for a time.  Sybrowsky co-founded Management Dynamics with his son, Joel, among others.  Similar to others he was involved with, this company was also involved in library services.

LDS Church experience
Sybrowsky served as a LDS Church missionary in the Canadian Mission headquartered in Toronto from 1964 to 1966.  He later served as a bishop (of the Hyde Park Ward in London, England), as a member of a stake high council, and as a counselor in a stake presidency.  Sybrowsky was president of the BYU 9th Stake from  1996 until 2001, when he was succeeded by Thomas B. Griffith. From 2001 to 2004, Sybrowsky was president of the church's Canada Toronto West Mission.

Sybrowsky was an LDS general authority and member of the Second Quorum of the Seventy from 2005 to 2011. During this time, he served first as a counselor and then as president of the church's Australia Area and later as an assistant executive director of the Church History Department.

Family and personal life 
Sybrowsky and his wife, Evelyn "Lynne" Frances Prior Sybrowsky, are the parents of nine children.  Sybrowsky met Lynne while he was serving as a missionary in Montreal.  Her family had joined the LDS Church in England about ten years earlier and later emigrated to Canada.  After he returned from his mission, Sybrowsky began dating her while they were both students at BYU.  They were married in the Salt Lake Temple in 1968.

He died at the age of 70 on September 10, 2014.

Notes

References
Joseph Walker, "Elder Sybrowsky tapped as new Southern Virginia president", Deseret News March 2, 2012
"Elder Paul K. Sybrowsky Of the Seventy", Liahona, May 2005 
"Elder Paul K. Sybrowsky", churchofjesuschrist.org
Church News July 9, 2005.

American general authorities (LDS Church)
American Mormon missionaries in Canada
20th-century Mormon missionaries
21st-century Mormon missionaries
Mission presidents (LDS Church)
Southern Virginia University people
Members of the Second Quorum of the Seventy (LDS Church)
1944 births
Brigham Young University alumni
Utah Valley University people
2014 deaths
People from Salt Lake City
American expatriates in the United Kingdom
Latter Day Saints from Utah
Latter Day Saints from Virginia